Ian De Souza Goodison (born 21 November 1972) is a Jamaican former professional footballer who played as a defender. He spent most of his career at English side Tranmere Rovers.

Club career

Born in Montego Bay, Saint James, Goodison began his career in minor Jamaican football leagues and was discovered in 1996 by René Simões who introduced him straight into the national squad. He joined Olympic Gardens in 1997, sharing his playing time at the club with a Cayman Islands-based team before making his first foray into English football via Third Division side Hull City, when he was signed along with fellow countryman and good friend Theo Whitmore by Brian Little. The Jamaican impressed during his time at Hull, epitomised by the fact that he was their Player of the Season for the 2000–01 season (his first in English football). He scored his first and only goal for the club in a 2–1 win over Carlisle United. Despite his impressive start Little's departure as manager was followed by that of Goodison who returned to Jamaica to play for Seba United.

Tranmere Rovers
Goodison joined Tranmere in February 2004 under Brian Little and played in the heart of the defence. The former Jamaican international played more than 350 times for the club, and was named supporters' Player of the Season three times, and the North West League One Footballer of the Year award also three times. He played in the Tranmere team which reached the quarter final of the FA Cup in his first season, whilst with his second season at the club Tranmere finished third in League One and entered the end of season play-offs. At the end of the 2011–12 season he signed a one-year contract extension which kept him at the club beyond his 40th birthday. He was the first player ever to play for Tranmere while in his forties.

In May 2013, Goodison signed another year extension to his contract, keeping him at the club until the summer of 2014. The deal included an option for a testimonial at Prenton Park. On 27 August 2013 he played 120 minutes against Bolton Wanderers in the League Cup; his performance was praised by fans and he was labelled as the 'best player on the park' by manager Ronnie Moore. On 13 October 2013 Goodison made his 400th appearance for Tranmere and captained them to a 1–0 win against Bradford City.

On 9 December 2013, it was reported that he had been arrested as part of a police investigation into match fixing, however the charges were later dropped. In May 2015, a testimonial for Goodison was held at Prenton Park. A team of ex-Tranmere teammates, including Enoch Showunmi, Eugene Dadi, Owain Fon Williams, and Ryan Lowe, faced an International XI, composed of ex-Jamaica teammates such as Ricardo Fuller, Darren Byfield, and Ricardo Gardner and other notable international players, such as ex-Tranmere teammate John Achterberg and Fabrice Muamba, who has not played professionally since suffering a cardiac arrest whilst playing for Bolton. Brian Little and Ronnie Moore managed the two sides, with Mike Dean acting as referee.

International career
Goodison made his debut for the Jamaica national team in a March 1996 friendly match against Guatemala and immediately scored his first international goal. Goodison was included in the 23-man squad named by Jamaica manager Theo Whitmore for the 2011 Gold Cup in the United States, though he was later dropped after failing to report for pre-tournament training in Brazil. As of May 2009 he has collected a country all-time record of 120 caps and scored 10 goals. 45 of those games were in FIFA World Cup qualification and in the 1998 tournament.

Career statistics

Club

International

International goals
Jamaica score listed first, score column indicates score after each Goodison goal.

See also
 List of men's footballers with 100 or more international caps

References

External links

Player profile – ReggaeBoyz
Player profile  – ReggaeBoyz Supporters Club

1972 births
Living people
People from Montego Bay
Jamaican footballers
Jamaican expatriate footballers
Jamaica international footballers
Association football defenders
Hull City A.F.C. players
Montego Bay United F.C. players
Tranmere Rovers F.C. players
English Football League players
Expatriate footballers in England
1998 CONCACAF Gold Cup players
1998 FIFA World Cup players
2000 CONCACAF Gold Cup players
2009 CONCACAF Gold Cup players
2011 CONCACAF Gold Cup players
FIFA Century Club
Jamaican expatriate sportspeople in England
Olympic Gardens F.C. players